Stalybridge is a town in Tameside, Greater Manchester, England, with a population of 23,731 at the 2011 Census.

When a water-powered cotton mill was constructed in 1776, Stalybridge became one of the first centres of textile manufacture during the Industrial Revolution. The wealth created in the 19th century from the factory-based cotton industry transformed an area of scattered farms and homesteads into a self-confident town.

History

Early history
The earliest evidence of human activity in Stalybridge is a flint scraper from the late Neolithic/early Bronze Age. Also bearing testament to the presence of man in prehistory are the Stalybridge cairns. One of the round cairns is the best-preserved Bronze Age monument in Tameside, and is protected as a scheduled monument. A branch of the Roman road between the forts at Manchester (Mamucium) and Melandra Castle (Ardotalia) is thought to run through Stalybridge to the fort of Castleshaw.

The settlement was originally called Stavelegh, which derives from the Old English , meaning "wood where the staves are got". The medieval Lords of the manor took de Stavelegh as their name, later becoming Stayley or Staley. The lordship of Longdendale was one of the ancient feudal estates of Cheshire and included the area of Stalybridge. Buckton Castle, near Stalybridge, was probably built by one of the earls of Chester in the 12th century. William de Neville was the first lord of Longdendale, appointed by the Earl of Chester between 1162 and 1186. The lordship of Longdendale included the manors of Staley, Godley, Hattersley, Hollingworth, Matley, Mottram, Newton, Tintwistle and Werneth; the manor of Staley was first mentioned between 1211 and 1225.

The first records of the de Stavelegh family as Lords of the Manor of Staley date from the early 13th century. Staley Hall was their residence. The present hall was built in the late 16th century on the same site as an earlier hall of the Stayley family which dated from before 1343.

Sir Ralph Staley (descendant of the de Stavelegh family) had no male heirs but an only daughter, Elizabeth Staley, who married Sir Thomas Assheton and united the manors of Ashton and Staley. Elizabeth and Thomas had two daughters and no sons. Margaret, the eldest of their two daughters, married Sir William Booth of Dunham Massey. The younger daughter Elizabeth was widowed and without children, and continued to live at Staley Hall until her death in 1553. In her will her share of the lordships of Staley and Ashton were left to the Booths.

The manor of Staley remained in the possession of the Booth family until the death of George Booth, 2nd Earl of Warrington on 2 August 1758. Upon his death, the Earldom of Warrington became extinct. His only daughter, Lady Mary Booth, the wife of Harry Grey, 4th Earl of Stamford, inherited all the Booth estates. The manor of Staley was owned by the Grey family until the extinction of the Earldom of Stampford on the death of Roger Grey, 10th Earl of Stamford in 1976. At this point, the family estates were dispersed. Stamford Street, Grey Street, Groby Street, Stamford Park, Stamford Golf Club and the two Stamford Arms public houses in Stalybridge are all named after the Grey family.

Industrial Revolution

As Stayley expanded in the 18th century, it reached the banks of the River Tame. After the construction of a bridge in 1707, the settlement was commonly referred to as Stalybridge, meaning the bridge at Stayley. By the mid-18th century Stalybridge had a population of just 140. Farming and woolen spinning were the main means of subsistence at this time.

In 1776, the town's first water-powered mill for carding and spinning cotton was built at Rassbottom. In 1789, the town's first spinning mill using the principle of Arkwright's Water Frame was built. By 1793, steam power had been introduced to the Stalybridge cotton industry; by 1803 there were eight cotton mills in the growing town containing 76,000 spindles. The Huddersfield Narrow Canal was completed in 1811 and still runs through the town.

The rapid growth of industry in Stalybridge was due to the introduction of machinery. This was, however, met with violent opposition. After the arrival of the Luddites in the area the doors of mills were kept locked day and night. Military aid was requested by the mill owners and a Scottish regiment under the Duke of Montrose was sent to the town. It was led by Captain Raines who made his headquarters at the Roe Cross Inn. Gangs of armed men destroyed power looms and fired mills. The disturbances in Stalybridge culminated with a night of violent rioting on 20 April 1812.

The social unrest did not curb the growth of Stalybridge. By 1814, there were twelve factories and, by 1818, the number had increased to sixteen. The Industrial Revolution led to a rapid increase in the town's population in the early part of the 19th century. The population of the town by 1823 was 5,500. In the following two years, partly because of an influx of Irish families seeking better wages, the population rose to 9,000. Stalybridge was among the first wave of towns to establish a Mechanics' Institute with a view to educating the growing number of workers. Only a year after the establishment of Manchester Mechanics' Institute, Stalybridge founded an Institute of its own. Its doors opened on 7 September 1825 on Shepley Street with a reading room on Queen Street.

On 9 May 1828, the Stalybridge Police and Market Act received Royal Assent, establishing Stalybridge as an independent town with a board of 21 Commissioners. Every male over the age of 21 who was the occupier of a rateable property under the act was entitled to vote at the election of the Commissioners. On 30 December 1831, Stalybridge Town Hall was officially opened. In 1833, the Commissioners set up the Stalybridge Police Force, the first of its kind in the country. By this year, the population of the town had reached 14,216 with 2.357 inhabited houses.

In 1834, a second bridge was built over the Tame. It was downstream of Staley Bridge and constructed of iron.

The second Chartist petition was presented to Parliament in April 1842. Stalybridge contributed 10,000 signatures. After the rejection of the petition the first general strike began in the coal mines of Staffordshire. The second phase of the strike originated in Stalybridge. A movement of resistance to the imposition of wage cuts in the mills, also known as the Plug Riots, it spread to involve nearly half a million workers throughout Britain and represented the biggest single exercise of working class strength in 19th century Britain. On 13 August 1842, there was a strike at Bayley's Cotton Mill in Stalybridge and roving cohorts of operatives carried the stoppage first to the whole area of Stalybridge and Ashton, then to Manchester, and subsequently to towns adjacent to Manchester, using as much force as was necessary to bring mills to a standstill. The movement remained, to outward appearances, largely non-political. Although the People's Charter was praised at public meetings, the resolutions that were passed at these were in almost all cases merely for a restoration of the wages of 1820, a ten-hour working day, or reduced rents.

In writing The Condition of The Working Class in England (1844), Friedrich Engels used Stalybridge as an example:

... multitudes of courts, back lanes, and remote nooks arise out of [the] confused way of building ... Add to this the shocking filth, and the repulsive effect of Stalybridge, in spite of its pretty surroundings, may be readily imagined.

John Summers first established an iron forge in Stalybridge in the 1840s. Later, he and his sons developed this into a major business and employed over 1,000 local men in their factory, the largest in the town.

The Ashton, Stalybridge and Liverpool Junction Railway Company was formed on 19 July 1844 and the railway was connected to Stalybridge on 5 October 1846. On 9 July 1847, the company was acquired by the Lancashire and Yorkshire Railway. On 1 August 1849, the Manchester, Stockport and Leeds Railway connected Stalybridge to Huddersfield and later to Stockport. This line later became part of the London and North Western Railway.

The cotton famine
On the outbreak of the American Civil War in 1861, the Stalybridge cotton mills rapidly ran short of cotton. Thousands of operatives were laid off. In October 1862, a meeting was held in Stalybridge Town Hall that passed a resolution blaming the Confederate States of America and their actions in the American Civil War, rather than U.S. blockades of seaports, for the cotton famine in Lancashire. By the winter of 1862–63, there were 7,000 unemployed operatives in the town. Only five of the town's 39 factories and 24 machine shops were employing people full-time. Contributions were sent from all over the world for the relief of the cotton operatives in Lancashire; and at one point three-quarters of Stalybridge workers were dependent on relief schemes. By 1863, there were 750 empty houses in the town. A thousand skilled men and women left the town, in what became known as "The Panic".

In 1863, the relief committee decided to substitute a system of relief by ticket instead of money. The tickets were to be presented at local grocery shops. An organised resistance was organised culminating on Friday 20 March 1863.

In 1867, Stalybridge was disturbed by the arrival of William Murphy. Records of this man indicate that his sole interest was to sow the seeds of dissent between Roman Catholics, who by this time had grown to significant proportions, and Protestants. He succeeded in this goal only too well for a full year. During 1868, there were a number of violent disturbances and rioting created by this man who described himself as a "renegade Roman Catholic". In his lectures to the public, "pretending to expose the religious practices of the Roman Catholic Church", he became a master at whipping up a crowd into a frenzy. Newspaper reports of the time told of his common practice of waving a revolver in the air in "a most threatening manner". On one occasion, he incited a riot of such proportions that Fr. Daley, the parish priest of St. Peter's, took to the roof of the church to defend it. A man was shot. The parish priest was tried but eventually acquitted at the Quarter Sessions. Following this incident, the community began to settle down and Murphy chose to extend his political activities elsewhere.

In 1867, the Victoria Bridge on Trinity Street was built. Victoria Market Hall was constructed in 1868 and the public baths were opened in May 1870. The baths were presented as a gift to the town by philanthropists and benefactors Robert Platt (1802–1882), born in Stalybridge, and his wife Margaret Platt (1819–1888), born in Salford.

Stalybridge Borough Band was formed in March 1871, holding its first rehearsals and meetings at the Moulder's Arms, Grasscroft Street, Castle Hall. The band was known as the 4th Cheshire Rifleman Volunteers (Borough Band) until 1896. The founder and first conductor was Alexander Owen, who conducted the band until at least 1907.

20th century
The character of Stalybridge altered over the 20th century. At the turn of the century, the cotton industry was still strong, and the population of the town reached its peak in 1901, at 27,623, but as trade dwindled the population began to decline, and despite the intensified employment of the war years, the main industry of Stalybridge continued to fail.
There were floods in Millbrook in May 1906.

Mrs Ada Summers was elected first woman mayor of Stalybridge in November 1919. At that time, mayors of boroughs were justices, as well as chairmen of borough benches, by right of office. However, it was not until the Sex Disqualification (Removal) Act 1919 came into force on 23 December 1919 that women could become magistrates. Sitting ex-officio Ada Summers became the first woman magistrate in the country and was sworn in on 31 December. Ada Summers was, probably, the first woman to officially adjudicate in court. Ada Summers photo appeared in the weekly journal Great Thoughts, 5 June 1920, alongside an interview on "The First Woman JP" on her work. Ada Summers was the widow of a local ironmaster. She was an active suffragist and Liberal and used her wealth and position to support a number of schemes designed to improve conditions in the town. These included a maternity and child welfare clinic, clinics for the sick and poor and an unofficial employment centre. She later became an alderman and was appointed MBE. On 31 May 1939 she was awarded the Honorary Freedom of the Borough.

In 1929, with no room for expansion at Stalybridge, the Summers sheet rolling and galvanising plants were transferred to Shotton in North Wales, having devastating effects on local employment; the new plant later became a  component in the British Steel Corporation. By 1932, seven of the town's largest mills had closed and unemployment reached 7,000. In 1934, the borough council set up an Industrial Development Committee for the purpose of encouraging new industries to settle in the town. The committee purchased Cheetham's Mill and rented it out to small firms engaged in a wide variety of enterprises. By 1939, unemployment in the town had almost disappeared.

1939–2000
Stalybridge experienced intensive black-out periods and frequent air-raid warning during the Second World War. Bombs dropped by enemy aircraft mainly landed in open country and there were no civilian casualties. On 19 July 1946, King George VI and Queen Elizabeth visited Stalybridge. The town's war memorial was extended after the war, to bear the names of an extra 124 men from the town; it was unveiled on 23 April 1950.

In the post-war period council housing was provided by the local authority as separate council estates. The Buckton Vale estate was built between January 1950 and March 1953, and the Stamford Park estate between January 1953 and January 1955; the Copley estate commenced building in August 1954 and the Ridgehill estate in January 1956.

In 1955, after the adoption of the first post-war slum clearance plan, new housing estates were built to replace the slums and, gradually, redundant textile mills were occupied by firms in the various light industries. New applications of engineering principles, the manufacture of rubber goods, plastics, chemicals and packaging materials were all introduced, as well as the addition of synthetic fibres to the textile trade, reducing unemployment. The plastics industry origin and growth are described by Craig and Bowes  in "Cotton Mills to Chemical Plants" (2013).

The early 1970s saw the development of private semi-detached and detached housing estates, particularly in the Mottram Rise, Hough Hill, Hollins and Carrbrook areas; the redevelopment of Castle Hall was also completed. The construction of the Buckton Vale overspill estate also took place in the early 1970s.

The early 1980s saw the closure of the public baths after the completion of Copley Recreation Centre. One of the symbols of the late-19th century civic improvement, the baths were subsequently demolished.

In 1991, for the first time since 1901, there was an increase in the population of Stalybridge to 22,295. The 1990s saw the proliferation of Mock Tudor style estates at Moorgate and along Huddersfield Road, close to Staley Hall; this continued into the 21st century with the completion of the Crowswood estate in Millbrook.

21st century

The Huddersfield Narrow Canal, which had been culverted in the early 1970s, was reinstated to the town centre between 1999 and May 2001 as part of a two-year multimillion-pound refurbishment. The canal now runs under the legs of an electricity pylon. The market hall closed on New Year's Eve 1999 and became the Civic Hall in 2001. Four years later, the area designated for retail space became exhibition space. There were plans to reopen the market and let the retail hall out to private contractors, though this came to naught. The town's cinema, the Palace, closed on 31 August 2003, with the last film being American Pie 3: The Wedding. The cinema has since been converted to become Rififi Nightclub and Amber Lounge Bar & Restaurant, which itself was closed down late in 2012 after two violent incidents on the same night.

In 2004, the Metropolitan Borough Council announced that they had granted permission for a developer to build 16 homes next to Staley Hall. A condition of the planning consent was that the hall be restored. As of 2008, the hall is still deteriorating. It is now listed as being in "very bad" condition on the English Heritage buildings at risk register. As of 2015 Staley Hall has been renovated and redeveloped into apartments.

Stalybridge suffered from Storm Angus on 21 November 2016 when  of rain fell on Tameside in five hours. Mottram Road and Huddersfield Road, Millbrook were flooded by water from a stream leading from the Walkerwood Reservoir.

In late June 2018, many properties in Stalybridge were threatened by a large wildfire advancing from Saddleworth Moor. 50 properties in the Carrbrook area of Stalybridge were evacuated on 26 June as the wildfire advanced towards them.

Governance

Civic history

The Municipal Borough of Stalybridge received its charter of incorporation on 5 March 1857, having been formed from part of Ashton-under-Lyne parish in Lancashire and parts of Dukinfield and Stayley parishes in Cheshire.  The Royal Charter declared that the council should consist of a Mayor, 6 Aldermen and 18 Councillors. The Borough was divided into three wards: Lancashire; Staley and Dukinfield. A list of Burgesses was published on 21 April 1857 and the first election of councillors was held on 1 May 1857. The contesting parties were the "whites" and the "yellows". The council met for the first time on 9 May and elected the first six Aldermen, from among those councillors the first Mayor, William Bayley, was elected.

The Arms of Stalybridge were granted by the College of Arms after the town received its charter of incorporation. The arms incorporated features from the coat of arms of the Stayley, Assheton, Dukinfield and Astley families who had all been land owners in the town. The motto, absque labore nihil, means "nothing without labour".

Under the terms of the Public Health Acts 1873 and 1875 Stalybridge corporation, like other municipal boroughs governed under the Municipal Corporations Act 1835, was designated as the authority governing the urban sanitary district.

The borough, both on the Lancashire and Cheshire sides of the river, was placed wholly within the administrative county of Cheshire in 1889, under the Local Government Act 1888, and Cheshire was adopted as the postal county for the entire town. The town is now part of the SK postcode area.

On 1 April 1936 Stalybridge was enlarged by gaining part of Matley civil parish, which had previously been part of Tintwistle rural district.

Stalybridge was twinned, in 1955, with Armentières, France.  In 1974 the area and assets of the Municipal Borough were combined with those of others districts, to form the Metropolitan Borough of Tameside. Stalybridge is currently represented by the occupants of nine of the 57 seats on the local Metropolitan Borough Council. These seats are spread over three wards: Stalybridge North, Stalybridge South and Dukinfield Stalybridge. Stalybridge currently has four Labour councillors and five Conservative councillors. Since 1998 the nine Stalybridge councillors have held meetings on a bimonthly basis, as the Stalybridge District Assembly.

Parliamentary representation

As a county palatine Cheshire was unrepresented in Parliament until the Chester and Cheshire (Constituencies) Act 1542. From 1545 Cheshire was represented by two Knights of the Shire. On the passage of the Great Reform Act of 1832, the area of Stalybridge south of the Tame was included in the North Cheshire constituency.

Between the passing of the Second Reform Act in 1867, and the general election of 1918, the town was represented in its own right through the Stalybridge Borough constituency. Since the 1918 general election the town has been represented in Parliament by the member for the Stalybridge and Hyde county constituency. The current Member of Parliament is Jonathan Reynolds, a former Tameside Councillor.

Geography

At  (53.483, −2.040) Stalybridge lies in the foothills of the Pennines, straddling the River Tame. The river forms part of the ancient boundary between Lancashire and Cheshire. On the boundary of the Peak District national park. Buckton Hill, the site of the mediaeval Buckton Castle, is another prominent landmark. The town centre itself is situated along the banks of the river between Ridge Hill to the north and Hough Hill  to the south. Stalybridge Weather Station is staffed by volunteers and has been providing statistics since 1999. The local bedrock is millstone grit, covered by a thin layer of soil over clay, with surface rock outcrops.

Over the course of the 20th century the population of the town declined, after the demolition of the mid-19th century high-density housing. At the 2001 census Stalybridge had a population of 22,568. The town includes the localities of Heyheads, Buckton Vale, Carrbrook, Millbrook, Brushes Estate, Copley, Mottram Rise, Woodlands, Matley, Hough Hill, Castle Hall, Hollins Street, Hydes, Rassbottom, Waterloo, Cocker Hill, the Hague, Springs, Ridge Hill and Heyrod.

Demography

According to the Office for National Statistics, at the time of the United Kingdom Census 2001, Stalybridge had a population of 22,568. Of those over 16 years old, 29.2% were single (never married) and 41.6% married. Stalybridge's 9,331 households included 29.1% one-person, 38.3% married couples living together, 9.7% were co-habiting couples, and 12.0% single parents with their children. Of those aged 16–74, 31.7% had no academic qualifications, below the average for Tameside (35.2%) but slightly higher than England (28.9%).

Population change

Environment

Much of the upland areas of the town are grouse moors. Boar Flat is part of the Dark Peak Site of Special Scientific Interest, as classified by Natural England. The slopes below the moors, particularly beneath Harridge Pike, are used for sheep grazing by the hill farms. The Stalybridge Country Park centres on two areas. Firstly, the Brushes Valley, with its four reservoirs running up into the Pennine Moors, and secondly Carrbrook, lying in the shadow of Buckton Castle. Linking the two areas, although outside the country park boundaries, is a good rights of way network, and areas of designated access land which take visitors into the Tame Valley, Longdendale and the Peak District. The country park affords views of the Cheshire Plain, Jodrell Bank and on very clear days the mountains of Snowdonia. Buckton Castle and Stalybridge cairn, a round cairn, west of Hollingworthhall Moor are both scheduled monuments.

The town's two parks are the main open spaces in the town centre. Cheetham Park was opened in June 1932 to a crowd of 15,000 people. The park was left to the town under the will of John Frederick Cheetham along with his house, Eastwood, and his collection of paintings, which now form part of the Astley Cheetham Art Gallery collection. The park is landscaped informally with large areas of woodland. Adjacent to Cheetham's Park lies the Eastwood Nature Reserve. Eastwood was one of the first reserves to be owned by the RSPB. It is managed by Cheshire Wildlife Trust. The reserve is a cut-over, lowland, raised mire SSSI, surrounded by a woodland fringe. Characteristic bog plants include sphagnum mosses, cotton grass and cross-leaved heath. Nine species of dragonfly and damselfly have been recorded on the reserve, along with the green hairstreak butterfly. The steep-sided broad-leaved woodland is bisected by Acres Brook and contains several old mill ponds. The geology is shale and sandstone, with a rich variety of plants and animals typical of woodland habitat on an acid soil. Access is from the A6018 Mottram Road. Car parking is available in Stalybridge Celtic FC's car park. The reserve occupies .

Stamford Park is registered by English Heritage as being of special interest. In 1865, local mill owner Abel Harrison died and his home, Highfield House, and its extensive grounds, on the border with Ashton were bought by the two towns. Neighbouring land was donated by George Harry Grey, 7th Earl of Stamford and 3rd Earl of Warrington. The whole area was landscaped to become Stamford Park and opened by the Earl on 12 July 1873. The former mill reservoir, known as Chadwick Dams, was incorporated into the park in 1891. The reservoir was divided in two by an embankment, with the southern section becoming the present boating lake. This area includes waterfalls cascading over rock faces and gargoyles built into the bridges and walls. The park has tennis courts, bowling greens, a children's playground, The park is the venue for the annual Tulip Sunday Festival.

Culture

Music
Stalybridge has an established musical tradition. Stalybridge Old Band was formed in 1809, perhaps the first civilian brass band in the world. The band currently contests in the second section. Carrbrook Brass currently contests in the fourth section and represent the town annually at the Armentières festival. An annual brass band contest has been held in the town on Whit Friday, since at least 1870. Other contests have been held on the same day in the surrounding villages of Millbrook, Carrbrook and Heyrod. There is now an established tradition of holding brass band contests on this day around Stalybridge, Mossley and Saddleworth. Bands travel by coach from all over the United Kingdom, and sometimes from other countries, to contest in as many different locations as possible on the day.

The song It's a Long Way to Tipperary was created in the Newmarket Tavern, by the composer Jack Judge, in 1912, after being challenged to write, compose, and produce a song in just one night;. It was first sung in public by him in the Grand Theatre on Corporation Street on 31 January 1912. On 31 January 1953 a memorial tablet was unveiled by Jack Hylton on the wall of the old Newmarket Tavern, where the song was composed. To coincide with the ceremony a wreath was laid on Jack Judge's grave, by the mayor of Oldbury. Jack Judge is now also commemorated by a statue in Lord Pendry Square outside the Old Victoria Market Hall.

More recently a live folk music tradition has developed in the town. The Buffet Bar Folk Club meets every Saturday at 9 pm and the Free and Easy folk club meet at 9 pm on alternate Thursdays at the White House public house in the town centre. Some members of the Fivepenny Piece who sang traditional North Country music in the 1970s were from Stalybridge. and the band performed songs such as "Stalybridge Station" and "Stalybridge Market". They also took "In Bowton's Yard", the work of local poet Samuel Laycock, and put it to music.

Art
Built as a gift to the town of Stalybridge by John Frederick Cheetham and his wife Beatrice Astley, the Astley Cheetham Art Gallery originally opened to the public as a lecture theatre on 14 January 1901. The space was turned into a gallery to house the Astley Cheetham Collection, bequeathed in 1932. This collection has grown with gifts and donations throughout the 20th century and is one of the most interesting small regional collections of 15th century Italian paintings. The collection of work by Italian old masters includes 'Portrait of a Young Man' by Alessandro Allori. Also, British art of the 19th and 20th centuries is represented by artists such as John Linnell, Richard Parkes Bonington, George Price Boyce, Burne-Jones, Mark Gertler and Duncan Grant. Aske Hall by J. M. W. Turner is also part of the gallery's collection. Alongside exhibitions of the collection, the gallery also hosts a programme of temporary exhibitions by regional artists.

During the earlier part of the 20th century, Stalybridge was artistically captured by the painter L. S. Lowry. Some of his paintings were of the people of Stalybridge. Lowry continued painting pictures until his death in 1976. His house is marked with a blue plaque on Stalybridge Road, Mottram in Longdendale. There is also a statue of him, holding his sketch pad, on a bench near the Stalybridge Road bus stop. Sheila Vaughan is a Stalybridge artist working in oils and acrylic. Her work and that of other Stalybridge artists such as Keith Taylor are displayed at the Peoples Gallery on Melbourne Street.

Literature
As well as being described by Engels, Stalybridge was featured in Disraeli's Coningsby. The children's author Beatrix Potter visited Gorse Hall many times as a child as it was the home of her maternal grandmother. Samuel Laycock (1826–93) was a librarian at the Mechanics' Institute for two years. His poetry presents a vivid impression of the mid-19th century, working-class life, and he drew on his personal experience in the cotton industry. His best-loved poems are "Bowton's Yard" and "Bonny Brid" – both written in Stalybridge. Tim Willocks, author of Bad City Blues, Green River Rising and Bloodstained Kings is from Stalybridge. Dolores Gordon-Smith, author of the Jack Haldean murder mystery series (published by Constable & Robinson and currently by Severn House) and Frankies' Letter (on Kindle) is from Stalybridge and currently resides there. M. John Harrison describes Stalybridge in his short story "The Ice Monkey" as a place "where nothing is clear-cut and there is neither town nor country, just a grim industrial muddle of the two".

Traditions

Whit Friday
Whit Friday is the name given to the first Friday after Whitsun in areas of northeast Cheshire, southeast Lancashire and the western fringes of Yorkshire. The day has a cultural significance in Stalybridge as the date on which the annual Whit Walks were traditionally held. It is also the day on which the traditional annual Whit Friday brass band contests are held.

Wakes Week
The wakes were originally religious festivals that commemorated church dedications. Particularly important was the Rushcart festival associated with Rogationtide. During the Industrial Revolution the tradition of the wakes was adapted into a regular summer break in the mill towns of Lancashire, where each locality would nominate a wakes week during which the cotton mills would all close at the same time. Stalybridge Wakes occurs in the third week of July. Wakes Week became the focus for fairs, and eventually for holidays where the mill workers would go to the seaside, eventually on the newly developing railways.

Food and drink
Stalybridge has the public house with the longest name in Britain – The Old Thirteenth Cheshire Astley Volunteer Rifleman Corps Inn, which closed in June 2016 but reopened in April 2019 – and also the one with the shortest, Q. The railway station is one of the last in Britain to retain its original buffet, the 1998 refurbishment of which won awards from CAMRA and English Heritage.

The restoration of the canal between 1999 and 2001 attracted new commercial ventures such as riverside cafés and boat trips. The reopening of the canal and the fact that the Tame runs through the town centre resulted in the nickname "Little Venice". Stalybridge has in recent years acquired another nickname, "Staly Vegas"; the nickname became popular and was used ironically after the controversial conversion of premises in the shopping area into nightclubs and bars, the proliferation of takeaways and the refurbishment of some of the more traditional pubs.

The town's traditional foods include Tater Hash (Potato Pie, or Meat and Potato Pie), a variation on Lancashire Hotpot, black peas, today mainly eaten on Whit Friday, and tripe. Stalybridge is the location of the region's last remaining tripe shop.

Media
The Stalybridge Reporter weekly newspaper was established in 1855. With The North Cheshire Herald it now serves the wider district under the name The Tamesider Reporter. Its office, and that of The Glossop Chronicle is at Park House, Acres Lane. The weekly free newspaper The Tameside Advertiser was established in 1979 and is now owned by Trinity Mirror and distributed throughout Stalybridge. The town has been used for location shoots for various film and television series. The most notable of these was the John Schlesinger film Yanks which featured Richard Gere and was released in 1979. The opening sequence of the film features Stalybridge War Memorial on Trinity Street and the US army camp scenes were filmed at Stamford Golf Club in spring 1978.

In 1986 the BBC children's TV series Jossy's Giants was filmed in the town. In 2009 the BBC3 Comedy Show We Are Klang was filmed at the Victoria Market Hall, and around the town centre. Scenes from Coronation Street, Making Out, Common As Muck and The League of Gentlemen have also been shot there. The town lies in the BBC North West television region and the ITV Northwest England Region, the franchise for which is held by Granada Television. In some northeastern parts of Stalybridge it is possible to pick up Yorkshire Television from the Emley Moor transmitter on UHF 47 (679.25 MHz).

Amenities

The NatWest have a branch in Stalybridge,  the branch is located on Melbourne Street. Stalybridge Post Office is located on Trinity Street. The sub-post offices are Ridge Hill and Carrbrook. The police station is located on Waterloo Road but is open only during working hours on weekdays. The fire station is located on Rassbottom Street. Stamford Park offers green space and facilities.

Transport

Road

The M67 is a feeder to the M60 Manchester orbital motorway and the city of Sheffield. The A635 A road passes through the town and the A6018 commences at Stalybridge. The B6175 and B6176 Huddersfield Road also pass through the town.

Railway

Stalybridge railway station is on the former London & North Western Railway route from Liverpool to Leeds. TransPennine Express services between Liverpool, Leeds and destinations in north-east England run via Manchester Piccadilly or Manchester Victoria, then rejoin the LNWR route line at Stalybridge.

The Stockport to Stalybridge Line only now carries two parliamentary services, one in each direction on Saturday mornings, to avoid closing the intermediate stations Reddish South and Denton.

Buses

Stalybridge bus station is run by Transport for Greater Manchester.
The majority of services that serve the bus station are run by First Greater Manchester and Stagecoach Manchester, whilst other operators include Nexus Move and Stotts.
There are frequent buses running to Ashton-under-Lyne. Buses also run to Glossop, Hyde, Manchester, Oldham and Saddleworth.

Tram

A tram network operated by the SHMD Joint Board ran lines through Stalybridge from 1904 to 1945, until their replacement by buses. The second-generation tramway Manchester Metrolink currently terminates at nearby Ashton-under-Lyne for connections to the city centre.

Canal

Huddersfield Narrow Canal passing through Stalybridge is part of the South Pennine Ring and runs from the junction with the Huddersfield Broad Canal near Aspley Basin at Huddersfield to the junction with the Ashton Canal at Whitefields Basin in Ashton-under-Lyne. The canal was completed in 1811, but was closed to navigation in 1951. It was reopened in 2001 and is now managed by the Canal and River Trust.

Sport

From the end of the 19th century until 1909 the main football team in the town was Stalybridge Rovers. The club reached the 1st round of the FA Cup in the 1900/1901 season and its players included Arthur Wharton and Herbert Chapman. Today the town's team is Stalybridge Celtic, founded 1909. They are one of four FIFA-recognised teams to be called Celtic. Usually based in non-league football, they are presently members of the National League North, in the sixth tier of English football.

There are two main cricket clubs in Stalybridge. Stayley Millbrook C.C. play in Millbrook and are members of the Greater Manchester Cricket League. Stalybridge St Paul's C.C. play on Cheetham Hill Road, Dukinfield on the ground formerly used by the now defunct Stalybridge Cricket Club. They are members of the Cheshire League Pyramid, and for the 2008 season are in the first division of the Cheshire Alliance.

Stamford Golf Club on Huddersfield Road has an 18-hole course. The club was incorporated on Saturday 24 August 1901 and was named after the local landowner the Earl of Stamford. It is a member of the Cheshire Union of Golf Clubs.

Priory Tennis Club is situated next to Cheetham's Park on Mottram Road. There are four astroturf courts, all with floodlights. The club is fully affiliated to the Cheshire branch of the Lawn Tennis Association.

The local athletics club is East Cheshire Harriers, founded in 1922 by an amalgamation of Dukinfield Harriers and Tintwistle Harriers. Th club's headquarters were once in Stalybridge but their home is now the Richmond Park Stadium, Ashton-under-Lyne.

A snooker league is operated by the Stalybridge and District Snooker, Billiards and Whist League, which has been in existence since 1910. The league starts around October each year and runs until May.

There are two crown green bowling clubs in the town. One in Stamford Park and one at Carrbrook village bowling green where there is also a Pétanque terrain.

In 1901 Joey Nuttall, of Stalybridge, lowered the world swimming record for the quarter-mile by 13 seconds, with a time of 5 minutes 38 seconds. In the same year he asserted his right to the title of the champion swimmer of the world beating three competitors in the  championship race at Doncaster, covering the distance in 6 minutes 30 seconds to win by a length and a half. His share of the spoil was £10, a cup, and two-thirds of the gate money. By 1901 Nutall had held the  world championship for over ten years. Stalybridge has a 25-metre 6-lane pool at Copley Recreation Centre which is home to the Stalybridge Amateur Swimming and Water Polo Club.

In 2006 Stalybridge-born cyclist Hamish Haynes won the UK National Road Race Championship.

Religion
Until the 18th century the Manor of Staley formed part of the parish of St Michael and All Angels, Mottram. The first church to be built in Stalybridge was Old St George's Church, Cocker Hill which was consecrated by the Bishop of Chester on 25 July 1776. The church collapsed on 15 May 1778. After the Industrial Revolution, the rising population and the settlement of people from various parts of the country meant that Stalybridge became a centre for a wide range of denominations and sects. The history of these churches in the town is complex, with some churches having occupied many different sites. The influence of the churches in the town remained strong well into the 20th century and formed part of the basis of Stalybridge's sense of identity.

The first Methodist chapel was erected in 1802 on the corner of Chapel Street and Rassbottom Street. The Baptist chapel on King Street, was opened by the Particular (Ebenezer) Baptists. This chapel was subsequently occupied by the Congregational Church on 3 October 1830. The Particular (Ebenezer) Baptists moved to a new chapel on Cross Leech Street on 28 October 1828.

Churches

Church of England
St George's is the parish church on the Lancashire side of the river in the Diocese of Manchester. It is known as New St George's and its foundation stone was laid on 24 June 1840.
On the Cheshire side, the parish church of Holy Trinity and Christ Church, Diocese of Chester, is situated in the town centre on Trinity Street, beside the former market hall. The foundation stone of the parish church of St Paul's, Staley was laid by Stapleton Stapleton-Cotton, 1st Viscount Combermere on 2 February 1838. It is along with St James', Millbrook situated in the Diocese of Chester.
St Pauls Church is on Huddersfield Road - and is a very active Parish Church - with a good music tradition and plenty of community activity

Roman Catholic
There are two Roman Catholic parishes – St Peter's, Stalybridge, the foundation stone of which was laid on 8 June 1838 and St Raphael's, Millbrook. Both parishes are in the Diocese of Shrewsbury.
Methodist
The octagonal Stalybridge Methodist Church on High Street opened in 1966.

Congregationalist
Stalybridge Congregational Church is to be found in a modern building on Baker Street, just off Acres Lane, behind the Organ public house. Its original building, which opened for worship in 1861 and was demolished around the turn of the 21st century, was situated between Melbourne Street and Trinity Street in the town centre.
Unitarian
The Unitarian Church on Forester Drive was established in 1870 and is part of the East Cheshire Union of Unitarian and Free Christian Churches.
Evangelical/Non-denominational
Stalybridge Revival Church, on Mount Street, formerly known as Stalybridge Evangelical Church, was established in 2009. The church has since moved to Millbrook but retains use of the building on Mount Street.

Education
Before 1910, primary education was provided by the church schools. In 1910 the borough opened its own school on Waterloo Road. In 1927, West Hill School, a central school for boys was opened. The central school for girls opened in 1930. Until 1980 secondary modern education was provided by schools in the town itself; and grammar school education by Hyde Grammar School. For Roman Catholic pupils, grammar school education was provided by Harrytown, Bredbury and Xaverian, Rusholme. Catholic secondary modern education was available from 1963 at St Peter and St Paul, Dukinfield.

In 1977 the Local Education Authority appealed to keep its grammar schools rather than be forced by the government to adopt a comprehensive system. The Lord of Appeal Lord Lane was personally critical of Fred Mulley, the Secretary of State for Education and Science for being "far from frank" about his reason for intervening in Tameside and joined in the judgement which found for Tameside and brought a halt to comprehensivisation. However, following the election of a Labour council in 1980 the local grammar schools were abolished and all the secondary modern and grammar schools in Stalybridge, Hyde and Dukinfield became comprehensives.

Primary schools
Stalyhill Junior School
Gorse Hall Primary School
Arlies Primary School
Silver Springs Primary Academy (formerly Ridge Hill)
Wild Bank Community School
St Peter's RC Primary School and Nursery Voluntary Aided by the Diocese of Shrewsbury
St Paul's C of E Primary School Voluntary Aided by the Diocese of Chester
St Raphael's RC Primary School Voluntary Aided by the Diocese of Shrewsbury
Buckton Vale Primary School
Millbrook Primary School
Trinity Christian School (Christian independent school)

Secondary schools
Copley Academy (formerly Copley High School) 11–16 Comprehensive Co-educational
West Hill School 11–16 Comprehensive boys' school
All Saints' Catholic College 11–18 Comprehensive Co-educational. Voluntary Aided by the Diocese of Shrewsbury. Located in Dukinfield and serves residents of Stalybridge, Hyde and Dukinfield.
Trinity Christian School (Christian independent school)

See also

Listed buildings in Stalybridge

References
Notes

Bibliography

Craig, Tom; Bowes, John (2013). Cotton Mills to Chemical Plants.  A chapter in the recent industrial archaeology of Stalybridge.

External links

 Stalybridge Weather Centre – Recent weather statistics in this town
 Stalybridge section of Tameside MBC website
 Tameside Council Galleries Site – Astley Cheetham Art Gallery

 
Towns in Greater Manchester
Unparished areas in Greater Manchester
Geography of Tameside